Stanisław Jakub Fołtyn (25 July 1936 – 8 March 2003) was a Polish footballer. He was part of Poland's squad at the 1960 Summer Olympics, but he did not play in any matches.

References

1936 births
2003 deaths
Association football goalkeepers
Polish footballers
Poland international footballers
Olympic footballers of Poland
Footballers at the 1960 Summer Olympics
Legia Warsaw players
Footballers from Warsaw